In rugby union, New Zealand first played against the British & Irish Lions in 1904, beating them 9–3 at Athletic Park, Wellington. Since then, there has been a total of 41 Test matches between the two teams, with the All Blacks winning 30 matches, the Lions winning seven and four draws. The most recent test, held at Eden Park, Auckland, on 8 July 2017, finished in a 15-15 draw.

List of series

List of matches

See also
 1888 British Lions tour to New Zealand and Australia

References 

 
New Zealand national rugby union team matches
British & Irish Lions matches
Sports rivalries in New Zealand